Paul Ronald (born 19 July 1971 in Glasgow) is a Scottish former football player.

Pro youth Coach Hamilton Accies FC between 2000-06, SFA qualified B Licence Holder and Youth diploma licence Holder.
Queens Park Youth coach / reserves coach 2006-2011 
He was then manager of East Superleague club stepping away from senior football to junior, Bo'ness United from June 2011 until September 2012. On 11 May 2013, Ronald joined Kirkintilloch Rob Roy as assistant manager to Stewart Maxwell.

Personal life 
Now working as Scout and Match analysis for Ross County Football Club  
Brother Gerry Ronald - ex pro footballer 70/80s Clydebank Football Club
Brother Derek Ronald - ex pro footballer 80s Clydebank FC, Malta Hibernians FC 80s/90s  
Ronald's son Owen is also a footballer.

References

External links

Living people
1971 births
Footballers from Glasgow
Scottish footballers
Clyde F.C. players
Happy Valley AA players
East Stirlingshire F.C. players
East Fife F.C. players
Scottish expatriate sportspeople in Hong Kong
Stranraer F.C. players
Berwick Rangers F.C. players
Airdrieonians F.C. (1878) players
Airdrieonians F.C. players
Dumbarton F.C. players
Queen's Park F.C. players
Scottish Football League players
Expatriate footballers in Hong Kong
Association football forwards
Scottish expatriate footballers
Scottish football managers
Scottish Junior Football Association managers